Too Funny to Fail: The Life & Death of The Dana Carvey Show is an American documentary film that premiered on Hulu on October 21, 2017. Directed, written and produced by Josh Greenbaum, it explores the creation of The Dana Carvey Show, how its creative team was assembled, and how the show ultimately came to be cancelled.

Production
The documentary features interviews with:

Cast members Louis C.K. and Charlie Kaufman only appear in archived footage.

Reception
Too Funny To Fail was met with a positive response from critics upon its premiere. On the review aggregation website Rotten Tomatoes, the film holds a 100% approval rating with an average rating of 7.5 out of 10 based on 18 reviews. The website's consensus reads, "Offering a detailed and highly entertaining oral history of the failed Dana Carvey Show, Too Funny to Fail is too funny to be missed."

In a positive review, The New York Times Margaret Lyons praised the film saying, "As sweetheart hagiographies go, the doc is joyous and funny. No one seems bitter or cynical, and the movie is less an excavation and more just a sublime collection of hilarious people speaking thoughtfully about silly clips from 20 years ago." In another favorable critique, NPRs David Bianculli commended the film saying, "Too Funny To Fail on its own terms is entertaining and enlightening from beginning to end." In a further approving analysis, The New Yorkers Ian Crouch lauded the film's tone saying, "the documentary itself is a rare thing: a movie about comedy that is, itself, actually funny." In a more mixed assessment, Uproxxs Steven Hyden criticized the structure of the film and its lack of interviews with key members of the show's crew saying, "Too Funny To Fail is a little too straightforward, dispensing the story in the conventional journalistic style of a 60 Minutes report. And the failure to land interviews with Louis C.K. and Charlie Kaufman — the former was a pivotal guiding force, the latter was a nebbish outlier on the writing staff who later applied his meta genius to meta-genius films — makes the documentary feel a little incomplete."

See also
List of original programs distributed by Hulu

References

External links

American documentary films
Documentary films about television
Films directed by Josh Greenbaum
Hulu original films
2017 documentary films
2010s English-language films
2010s American films
English-language documentary films